Pope Innocent X (6 May 1574 – 7 January 1655), born Giovanni Battista Pamphilj (or Pamphili), was head of the Catholic Church and ruler of the Papal States from 15 September 1644 to his death in January 1655.

Born in Rome of a family from Gubbio in Umbria who had come to Rome during the pontificate of Pope Innocent IX, Pamphili was trained as a lawyer and graduated from the Collegio Romano. He followed a conventional cursus honorum, following his uncle Girolamo Pamphili as auditor of the Rota, and like him, attaining the position of cardinal-priest of Sant'Eusebio. Before becoming pope, Pamphili served as a papal diplomat to Naples, France, and Spain.

Pamphili succeeded Pope Urban VIII (1623–44) on 15 September 1644 as Pope Innocent X, after a contentious papal conclave that featured a rivalry between French and Spanish factions.

Innocent X was one of the most politically shrewd pontiffs of the era, greatly increasing the temporal power of the Holy See. Major political events in which he was involved included the English Civil War, conflicts with French church officials over financial fraud issues, and hostilities with the Duchy of Parma related to the First War of Castro.

In theology, Innocent X issued a papal bull condemning the beliefs of Jansenism.

Biography

Early life
Giovanni Battista Pamphili was born in Rome on 5 May 1574, the son of Camillo Pamphili, of the Roman Pamphili family. The family, originally from Gubbio, was directly descended from Pope Alexander VI.

In 1594 he graduated from the Roman College and followed a conventional path through the ranks of the Catholic Church. He served as a consistorial lawyer in 1601, and in 1604 succeeded his uncle, Cardinal Girolamo Pamphili, as auditor of the Roman Rota, the ecclesiastical appellate tribunal. He was also a canonist of the Sacred Apostolic Penitentiary, a second tribunal.

In 1623 Pope Gregory XV sent him as apostolic nuncio (ecclesiastical diplomat) to the court of the Kingdom of Naples. In 1625 Pope Urban VIII sent him to accompany his nephew, Francesco Barberini, whom he had accredited as nuncio, first to France and then Spain. In January 1626, Pamphili was appointed titular Latin Patriarch of Antioch.

In reward for his labors, in May 1626 Giovanni Battista was made nuncio to the court of Philip IV of Spain. The position led to a lifelong association with the Spaniards which was of great use during the papal conclave of 1644. He was created Cardinal in pectore in 1627 and published in 1629.

Papacy

Election

The 1644 conclave for the election of a successor to Pope Urban VIII was long and contentious, lasting from 9 August to 15 September. A large French faction led by Urban VIII's nephews objected to the Spanish candidate, as an enemy of Cardinal Mazarin, who guided French policy. They put up their own candidate (Giulio Cesare Sacchetti) but could not establish enough support for him and agreed to Cardinal Pamphili as an acceptable compromise, though he had served as legate to Spain. Mazarin, bearing the French veto of Pamphili, arrived too late, and the election was accomplished.

Relations with France

Pamphili chose to be called Innocent X. Soon after his accession he initiated legal action against the Barberini for misappropriation of public funds. The brothers Francesco Barberini, Antonio Barberini and Taddeo Barberini fled to Paris, where they found a powerful protector in Cardinal Mazarin. Innocent X confiscated their property, and on 19 February 1646, issued a papal bull decreeing that all cardinals who might leave the Papal States for six months without express papal permission would be deprived of their benefices and eventually of their cardinalate itself. The French parliament declared the papal ordinance void in France, but Innocent X did not yield until Mazarin prepared to send troops to Italy. Henceforth the papal policy towards France became more friendly, and somewhat later the Barberini were rehabilitated when the son of Taddeo Barberini, Maffeo Barberini, married Olimpia Giustiniani, a niece of Innocent X.

In 1653, Innocent X, with the Cum occasione papal bull, condemned five propositions of Jansenius's Augustinus, as heretical and close to Lutheranism. This led to the formulary controversy, Blaise Pascal's writing of the Lettres Provinciales, and finally to the razing of the Jansenist convent of Port-Royal and the subsequent dissolving of its community.

Relations with Parma

The death of Pope Urban VIII is said to have been hastened by his chagrin at the result of the First War of Castro, a war he had undertaken against Odoardo Farnese, the duke of Parma. Hostilities between the papacy and the Duchy of Parma resumed in 1649, and forces loyal to Pope Innocent X destroyed the city of Castro on 2 September 1649.

Innocent X objected to the conclusion of the Peace of Westphalia, which his nuncio, Fabio Chigi, protested in vain. In 1650 Innocent X issued the brief Zelo Domus Dei against the Peace of Westphalia, and backdated it to 1648 in order to preserve potential claims for confiscated land and property. The protests were ignored by the European powers.

English Civil War
During the Civil War (1642–49) in England and Ireland, Innocent X strongly supported the independent Confederate Ireland, over the objections of Mazarin and the former English Queen and at that time queen mother, Henrietta Maria, exiled in Paris.  The pope sent Giovanni Battista Rinuccini, archbishop of Fermo, as a special nuncio to Ireland. He arrived at Kilkenny with a large quantity of arms including 20,000 pounds of gunpowder, and a very large sum of money. Rinuccini hoped he could discourage the Confederates from allying with Charles I and the Royalists in the English Civil War and instead encourage them towards the foundation of an independent Catholic-ruled Ireland.

At Kilkenny, Rinuccini was received with great honours, asserting in his Latin declaration that the object of his mission was to sustain the king but, above all, to rescue from pains and penalties the Catholic people of Ireland in securing the free and public exercise of the Catholic religion, and the restoration of the churches and church property. In the end, Oliver Cromwell restored Ireland to the Parliamentarian side and Rinuccini returned to Rome in 1649, after four fruitless years.

Other activities

During the papacy of Pope Urban VIII, the future Innocent X was the pope's most significant rival among the College of Cardinals. Antonio Barberini, Urban VIII's brother, was a cardinal who had begun his career with the Capuchin brothers. About 1635, at the height of the Thirty Years' War in Germany, in which the papacy was intricately involved, Cardinal Antonio commissioned Guido Reni's painting of the Archangel Michael, trampling Satan, who bears the recognizable features of Innocent X. This bold political artwork still hangs in a side chapel of the Capuchin friars' Church of the Conception (Santa Maria della Concezione) in Rome. A legend related to the painting is that the dashing and high-living artist, Guido Reni, had been insulted by rumours he thought were circulated by Cardinal Pamphili.

When, a few years later, Pamphili was raised to the papacy, other Barberini relatives fled to France on embezzlement accusations. Despite this, the Capuchins held fast to their chapel altarpiece.

Innocent was responsible for raising the Colegio de Santo Tomás de Nuestra Señora del Santísimo Rosario into the rank of a university. It is now the University of Santo Tomás in Manila, the oldest existing in Asia.

In 1650, Innocent X celebrated a Jubilee. He embellished Rome with inlaid floors and bas-relief in Saint Peter's, erected Bernini's Fontana dei Quattro Fiumi in Piazza Navona, the Pamphili stronghold in Rome, and ordered the construction of Palazzo Nuovo at the Campidoglio.

Innocent X is also the subject of Portrait of Innocent X, a famous painting by Diego Velázquez housed in the family gallery of Palazzo Doria (Galleria Doria Pamphili). This portrait inspired the "Screaming Pope" paintings by 20th-century painter Francis Bacon, the most famous of which is Bacon's Study after Velázquez's Portrait of Pope Innocent X.

Olimpia Maidalchini
Olimpia Maidalchini was married to Innocent X's late brother, and was believed to be his mistress because of her influence over him in matters of promotion and politics. This state of affairs was alluded to in the Encyclopædia Britannica 9th edition (1880):

German historian Leopold von Ranke concluded that she was not Innocent X's lover.

Death and legacy

In his later years, Innocent X suffered from gout, causing him intense pain and severely restricting his movements. The eighty-year-old pontiff's health began to decline in August 1654. By the evening of 26 December his condition had deteriorated to the extent that the family was summoned.

On 27 December, he blessed his nephew, niece, and their children, and then had a brief meeting with Cardinals Flavio Chigi and Decio Azzolino. That night he had a little rest, though his condition did not improve.

On 28 December, Innocent X received the Last rites and expressed his desire to take leave of the cardinals. In anticipation of the Pope's expected death many of the cardinals had already gathered in Rome in advance of a subsequent conclave. Thirty-nine gathered at his bedside at the Quirinal Palace.

On 1 January 1655, Mass was celebrated at the pope's bedside, and the same was done on 6 January, when Innocent X also received the Viaticum for the last  time. Secretary of State Chigi, who had been in attendance during the last twelve days, Prefect of the Sacred Palace Bishop Scotti, and Sacristan Monsignor Altini, as well as, various attendants were present when the Pope died on the night of 6 January 1655.

The Swiss Guard escorted Papal Camerlengo Cardinal Antonio Barberini to the Quirinal to perform the requisite rituals and Cardinal de Medici visited with the Pope's three nephews, who were in another room. After an autopsy, the body was embalmed and the next day taken to the Vatican where it was placed on a catafalque in the Sistine Chapel. On 8 January it was transferred to St. Peter's Basilica, where the sealing of the coffin was witnessed by Cardinals Ludovisi, Chigi, Omodeo, Ottoboni, Santacroce, Aldobrandini, Vidman, Raggi, Pio and Gualtieri, Princes Pamphili, Ludovisi and Giustiniani, and the Master of Ceremonies Fulvio Servantio. A funeral held on 17 January. Innocent's tomb is located in the Church of Sant'Agnese in Agone which he had built in 1652 adjacent to the family palace, the Palazzo Pamphili, in Rome.

Innocent X was succeeded by Pope Alexander VII who promised Innocent X that he would build more schools in Europe.

See also 
 Cardinals created by Innocent X
 Pamphili, with Innocent X's family tree
 Portrait of Innocent X
 Study after Velázquez's Portrait of Pope Innocent X

Notes

References

Further reading 
Guido Braun: Innozenz X. Der Papst als ‚padre comune‘. In: Michael Matheus / Lutz Klinkhammer (eds.): Eigenbild im Konflikt. Krisensituationen des Papsttums zwischen Gregor VII. und Benedikt XV. WBG, Darmstadt, 2009, pp. 119ff., .

Chev. Artaud De Montor, 1911. The Lives and Times of the Popes

External links

 
Popes
Italian popes
Diplomats of the Holy See
Clergy from Rome
1574 births
1655 deaths
Giovanni Battista
17th-century popes
Latin Patriarchs of Antioch
Cardinals created by Pope Urban VIII